Hansa Jivraj Mehta (3 July 1897 – 4 April 1995) was a reformist, social activist, educator, independence activist, feminist and writer from India.

Early life 
Hansa Mehta was born in a Nagar Brahmin family on 3 July 1897. She was a daughter of Manubhai Mehta, Dewan of Baroda State, and the granddaughter of Nandshankar Mehta, the author of the first Gujarati novel Karan Ghelo.

She graduated with Philosophy in 1918. She studied journalism and sociology in England. In 1918, she met Sarojini Naidu and later Mahatma Gandhi in 1922.

She was married to Jivraj Narayan Mehta, an eminent physician and administrator who was the first Chief Minister of Gujarat.

Career

Politics, education and activism 
Hansa Mehta organized the picketing of shops selling foreign clothes and liquor, and participated in other freedom movement activities in line with the advice of Mahatma Gandhi. Later She established Desh Sevika Dal in 1930. She was even arrested and sent to jail by the British along with her husband in 1932. she was elected to Bombay Legislative Council.

After independence, she was among the 15 women who were part of the constituent assembly that drafted the Indian Constitution. She was a member of the Advisory Committee and Sub Committee on Fundamental Rights. She advocated for equality and justice for women in India.

Hansa was elected to Bombay Schools Committee in 1926 and became president of All India Women's Conference in 1945–46. In her presidential address at the All India Women's Conference convention held in Hyderabad, she proposed a Charter of Women's Rights. She held different posts in India from 1945 to 1960 - the vice-chancellor of SNDT Women's University, member of All India Secondary Board of Education, president of Inter University Board of India and vice-chancellor of Maharaja Sayajirao University of Baroda, among others.

Hansa represented India on the Nuclear Sub-Committee on the status of women in 1946. As the Indian delegate on the UN Human Rights Commission in 1947–48, she was responsible for changing the language of the Universal Declaration of Human Rights from "all men are born free and equal" to "all human beings are born free and equal", highlighting the need for gender equality. Hansa later went on to become the vice chairman of the Human Rights Commission of the United Nations in 1950. She was also a member of the Executive Board of UNESCO.

Literary career 
She wrote several children's books in Gujarati including Arunnu Adbhut Swapna (1934), Bablana Parakramo (1929), Balvartavali Part 1-2 (1926, 1929). She translated some books of Valmiki Ramayana: Aranyakanda, Balakanda and Sundarakanda. She translated many English stories, including Gulliver's Travels. She had also adapted some plays of Shakespeare. Her essays were collected and published as Ketlak Lekho (1978).

Bibliography 

In Gujarati, Hindi and Tamil

 Traṇa nāṭako. (1926). Mumbaī : Haṃsā Mhetā 
 Mehta, Hansa; Swift, Jonathan. Goḷībāranī musāpharī. Vaḍodarā : Bālajīvana Kāryālaya (1931) 
 Rukmiṇī. (1933). Vaḍodarā : Ārya Sudhāraka Presa  
 Aruṇanuṃ adbhuta svapna. (1934). Mumbaī : Haṃsā Mahetā 
 Mehta, S. Haṅsa. (1950). Arunnanu adbhuta svapṅa. Ahmedabad, India : Gujar Granth Ratna Karyalaya 
 Bāḷavārtāvali [Bacchanal]. (1939). Mumbaī : Sola ejaṇṭa, Śishṭa Sāhitya Bhaṇḍāra 
 Himālaya svarūpa ane bījaṃ nāṭako. Śishṭa.
 Mehta, Hansa. Trana natako ane bijam [Three plays and so on]. (1956). 
 Mehta, Hansa; Cimanalāla, Candravadana; Sitāṃśu, Yaśaścandra. Keṭalāka lekha. Mumbaī : Phārbasa Gujarātī Sabhā (1977) 
 Mehta, Hansa; Collodi, Carlo. Bavlana prakramo [Brave feats] Rajkot : Pravin Rajkot (1993)  
 Mehta, Hansa. Ram Katha. [The story of Ram] (1993). Delhi : National Book Trust.   
 Mehta, Hansa. Ayotiyin iḷavarasan. (2004). Delhi : National Book Trust.   

In English

 Post-war educational reconstruction: with special reference to women's education in India. (----) Bombay : Pratibha 
 The Woman under the Hindu Law of Marriage & Succession. (1944). p. 52, Bombay : Pratibha Publications. 
 Hansa, Mehta. (ed.) "Civil liberties". (1945). for the All-India Women's Conference, Aundh : Aundh Pub. Trust, 
 Indian woman. (1981). New Delhi : Butala

Translation
into English

 King of Ujjainī; VIKRAMĀDITYA Haṃsā; Mehta, Hansa. The Adventures of King Vikrama. (Selections from Ṣāmala Bhaṭa's Gujarati version of Siṃhāsana-batrīsī. With plates.) (1948). Bombay : Oxford University Press, pp.vii, 150. 
 Mehta, Hansa; Shukla, V. K. Adventures of King Vikrama. (1954) London : Oxford Univ. Press, 
 Sarma, D.S.; Mehta, Hansa. The prince of Ayodhya. New Delhi : National Book Trust, India : Chief stockists in India, Thomson Press (India) (1974).  
 Une femme d'aujourd'hui: roman. (1966). Paris : Albin Michel.

Awards
Hansa Mehta was awarded the Padma Bhushan in 1959.

See also
 List of Gujarati-language writers

References

Indian independence activists from Gujarat
Indian women educational theorists
1897 births
1995 deaths
Gujarati-language writers
Members of the Constituent Assembly of India
Recipients of the Padma Bhushan in social work
Prisoners and detainees of British India
People from Vadodara
Indian women's rights activists
Gujarati people
Gandhians
20th-century Indian educational theorists
Scientists from Gujarat
20th-century Indian women scientists
Activists from Gujarat
Women educators from Chandigarh
Women Indian independence activists
20th-century Indian women politicians
20th-century Indian politicians
19th-century Indian women
19th-century Indian people
Women educators from Gujarat
Indian feminists
Educators from Gujarat
Educators from Chandigarh
Indian translators
Indian children's writers
20th-century translators
20th-century women educators